The Rock Creek Roadless Area (B032) is located northwest of Buffalo, Wyoming, in the Bighorn National Forest. This area represents the entire spectrum of environments found in the Bighorn National Forest and encompasses prairie land to high alpine peaks. This roadless area is the source of the north, middle, and south forks of Rock Creek, Balm of Gilead Creek, Pheasant Creek, and Ditch Creek. The area is flanked on the eastern side by the Bud Love Big Game Winter Range and the HF Bar Ranch Historic District. On the southern side the roadless area is surrounded by the Paradise Guest Ranch. The roadless area is home to elk, moose, mountain lion, pine marten, blue grouse, ruffed grouse, and raptors. The Rock Creek area is the largest area of quality elk security habitat outside of the Cloud Peak Wilderness Area and would provide an important corridor from the high country to the Bud Love Habitat Management Unit. The Rock Creek roadless area is dominated by lodgepole pine, some ponderosa, and aspen stands with low-growing juniper in the undergrowth. The area has not been opened to roads due to the ruggedness of the landscape and the high costs of implementation.

In the 1990s three holes were drilled and abandoned north, south, and east of Rock Creek to assess the area for oil and gas production.  The area has a very low potential for natural resource and mineral exploitation.

Roadless Area definition
A roadless area is the designation for backcountry, undeveloped lands having wilderness attributes as specified in the Wilderness Act of 1964 and that could be considered for inclusion in the National Wilderness Preservation System. The Rock Creek area was inventoried in the Roadless Area Review and Evaluation process (RARE II) and managed under the land management plans of the US Forest Service. The Roadless Area Conservation Rule was a federal regulation that was adopted by the U.S. Forest Service shortly before President William Clinton left office on Jan. 12, 2001. It allowed reasonable exceptions for management activities like fire suppression and other public health safety measures, and permitted projects, such as grazing and mining, with valid existing rights to proceed.  At the same time, the national roadless rule attempted to conserve fish and wildlife habitat while not closing any existing access to these lands. At issue are 58.5 million acres (236,000 km²), located in 42 states, but primarily in the West. Within 24 hours of taking office, President Bush's appointees began their campaign, with the timber industry, to undo this new rule. In May 2005, the Bush administration repealed the Roadless Rule, replacing it with a process that allows governors to petition the Forest Service for protection of the national forest roadless lands within their states, but giving the federal government the power to reject the petitions. The states of California, Oregon, New Mexico, and Washington successfully challenged the Bush roadless rule, resulting in reinstatement of the Clinton rule in 2006, the Roadless Area Conservation Rule was re-established. This rule set national guidelines limiting backcountry timber harvest and road construction and reconstruction with a goal of upholding the roadless characteristics found on millions of acres of inventoried roadless areas. The state of Wyoming and the Colorado Mining Association are currently involved in a lawsuit with the 10th U.S. Circuit Court of Appeals on the basis that the 2001 federal rule banning construction of new roads on National Forest land violates the law.

Although Rock Creek is protected from development through a roadless designation, roadless status is constantly under review and revocation. During the RARE (Roadless Area Review and Evaluation) II revision the Rock Creek roadless area was reduced from 51,000 acres was to 34,000 acres and illegal ORV roads that continued past the original southern boundary were inventoried and assimilated into the Forest Service Road system.

Wilderness Designation
The Rock Creek roadless area was the last area to be removed from the 1984 Wyoming Wilderness Act due to its potential for water storage and oil and gas development.  Dick Cheney has been quoted saying:

the Wyoming Wilderness Act was one of my proudest achievements as a member of congress ... We set aside a part of Wyoming, nearly a million acres of wilderness that ought to be separate and not developed. We think that was important.

The USFS recommended the Rock Creek area for wilderness designation in its 2005 Revised Land & Resource Management Plan.  If the Rock Creek area is designated wilderness it will be assimilated and added to the Cloud Peak Wilderness Area. Congresswoman Cynthia Lummis toured the area in 2009 and when asked about her position regarding the recommendation for designating the Rock Creek roadless area as wilderness, she stated she would support the decisions of the local Johnson County Commissioners.  On March 16, 2010, Albert L. "Smokey" Wildeman moved to adopt Resolution #399 opposing the proposal for "Wilderness Designation" in the Rock Creek area. Delbert Eitel seconded, and the motion was carried.

In early September 2010, videographer Melinda Binks and reporter Rebecca Huntington from Assignment Earth  documented the Rock Creek Area on horseback. Highlighting outfitter Robert Granstrom of Buffalo Mountain Outfitters and Wyoming Wilderness Association employees advocating for wilderness designation.

Late September 2010, 9 volunteers and staff of the Wyoming Wilderness Association traveled to Washington, D.C. to speak with the states congressional officials.  Although legislation has yet to come from the visit, the event brought widespread awareness about wilderness across the US through the Campaign for America's Wilderness' Wilderness Week.

Suppositions
Supposition, speculation and misconception is common place in preservation and conservationist movements and can be linked to Environmental disregard or crime.  Criticism of wilderness designation is often not based in fact but rather based on generalizations, stereotypes, political ideals, and fear based accusations.  Critics of wilderness designation often believe that the land will become off limits to forest users after designation or activities will be limited such as hunting and grazing due to the designation.

Timber
Timber harvest is not economically feasible in the Rock Creek Roadless Area due to the lack of roads and infrastructure.  Most lodgepole found in the Rock Creek Area is unmarketable due to its small size and cost to harvest.

Hunting
Hunting would continue if the Rock Creek Roadless Area was designated wilderness.  However out of state Big Game hunters would be required to hire a licensed outfitter or go hunting with a licensed resident hunter when entering Wilderness.

Grazing
Grazing would continue if the Rock Creek Roadless Area was designated wilderness and permitted leases would continue.

Fire and Insect Damage
The Wilderness Act allows measures to be taken, as necessary, in wilderness areas to control issues such as fire, insects, and diseases.  A 2010 report by the National Center for Conservation Science and Policy and the Xerces Society has shown that battling forest beetles may be counterproductive.

Oil and Gas Development
Test holes that were drilled in the 1990s demonstrated that the Rock Creek Roadless area has a very low development potential. Shortly after the 1984 Wyoming Wilderness Act, Oil and Gas leases in the area expired and since then the area has been removed from the leasing process.

Potential for Water Storage
The Rock Creek Roadless Area was removed from the Wyoming Wilderness Act due to its potential for water storage, which would require damming one or several forks of Rock Creek.  However, the deeply cut limestone canyons which are found in the Rock Creek Area are not geologically stable for water storage and would not add a significant or economically feasible amount of capacity.

Too much wilderness
Those in opposition to designating the Rock Creek Roadless Area as wilderness often state that the Bighorn National Forest already has too much wilderness with the Cloud Peak Wilderness Area. In reality, wilderness is only a fraction of the total number of acres on the Bighorn National Forest.  Out of the total  in the BNF, the Cloud Peak Wilderness is only . If the Rock Creek Roadless Area was designated wilderness then the total percentage of wilderness in the Bighorns would only be 18 percent.

Overuse due to designation
Many critics believe that if the Rock Creek Roadless Area is designated wilderness it will see increased pressure from recreational enthusiasts causing adverse damage to sensitive areas from "loving them to death."  A study presented to the Johnson County Commissioners by the Wyoming Wilderness Association has shown a decrease in use after wilderness designation, with reference to the Rattlesnake National Recreation Area and Wilderness.

References

External links
http://www.wildwyo.org/
http://gf.state.wy.us/
http://www.hfbar.com/Site_2/Welcome_to_the_Ranch.html
http://www.paradiseranch.com/

Protected areas of Wyoming
Protected areas of Johnson County, Wyoming
Bighorn National Forest